Ageneiosus ucayalensis is a species of driftwood catfish of the family Auchenipteridae. It can be found in South America.

References

Bibliography
Eschmeyer, William N., ed. 1998. Catalog of Fishes. Special Publication of the Center for Biodiversity Research and Information, num. 1, vol. 1–3. California Academy of Sciences. San Francisco, California, United States. 2905. .

ucayalensis
Fish of Bolivia
Freshwater fish of Brazil
Freshwater fish of Colombia
Freshwater fish of Ecuador
Fish of French Guiana
Fish of Guyana
Freshwater fish of Peru
Fish of Suriname
Fish of Venezuela
Fish of the Amazon basin
Taxa named by François-Louis Laporte, comte de Castelnau
Fish described in 1855